Riedau is a municipality in the district of Schärding in the Austrian state of Upper Austria.

Geography
Riedau lies in the Innviertel. About 13 percent of the municipality is forest, and 71 percent is farmland.

References

Cities and towns in Schärding District